Eter Astemirova (born 1943), is a Georgian engineer and politician, who served as the Minister of Refugees and Accommodation in the cabinet of Zurab Zhvania from 2003 until 2005.

Born in a northern town, Astemirova studied at the Hydrometeorological Institute of Leningrad, specializing in terrestrial hydrology, while her family moved to Grozny and she started working in the Checheno-Ingush Autonomous SSR Melioration Ministry. She graduated in 1976. 

From 1977 to 1978 she worked as an engineer at the Calgary Construction Research Institute.

During the war and until 1995 she was the Chairman of the Committee on Human Rights and Inter-Ethnic Relations of the Government of the Autonomous Republic of Abkhazia. Also was the head of the Georgian group of trilateral commission and prepared some documents used in the Genocide Commission. Between 1995 and 2003, she was president of the Human Rights, Inter-Ethnic Relations and Ethics Commission of the Supreme Council of Abkhazia.

Was appointed Minister on 23 December 2003 by President Mikheil Saakashvili.

In the period 2006 to 2010 she was assigned to the Embassy of Georgia in the Republic of Azerbaijan as an extraordinary and plenipotentiary ambassador.

References

1943 births
Living people
Government ministers of Georgia (country)
Women government ministers of Georgia (country)
21st-century women politicians from Georgia (country)
21st-century politicians from Georgia (country)
Abkhazian women in politics
Women diplomats from Georgia (country)
Russian State Hydrometeorological University alumni